Kyriacós P. Kouros is the head of the Cyprus Intelligence Service, and is scheduled to be the head of the President's Diplomatic Office.

Career
Kouros previously worked as a journalist.

He was Cyprus' Ambassador to Lebanon in 2009. Kouros served as Cyprus' Ambassador to the Netherlands in June 2012. He has also served as Cyprus' permanent representative to the Organisation for the Prohibition of Chemical Weapons.

Kouros became chief of the Cyprus Intelligence Service in 2015, following the resignation of Andreas Pentaras. He presides over the Councils of Geopolitical Affairs and Energy Politics.

References

Living people
Ambassadors of Cyprus
Cypriot journalists
Cypriot political people
Year of birth missing (living people)